Reece is an unincorporated community in Greenwood County, Kansas, United States.  It is located approximately 7.5 miles west of the city of Eureka.

History
A post office was opened in Reece in 1870, and remained in operation until it was discontinued in 1975. The post office in town was called Collins until 1883.

Education
The community is served by Eureka USD 389 public school district.

References

Further reading

External links
 Greenwood County maps: Current, Historic, KDOT

Unincorporated communities in Greenwood County, Kansas
Unincorporated communities in Kansas